Rudne is an urban-type settlement in Lviv Raion in Lviv Oblast of Ukraine. It belongs to Lviv urban hromada, one of the hromadas of Ukraine.

Location 
Rudne is located 11 kilometers west of the Lviv city center. The Lviv Ring Road is 1 kilometer from the village. The Lviv-Mostyska Road passes through the village.

History 
Between 1774 and 1918 it was part of Austrian Galicia. After the end of World War I Briukhovychi became part of  Lwów Powiat in Lwów Voivodeship, part of Poland. In 1939 it was annexed by the Soviet Union. It was given the status of an urban-type settlement in 1940.

Rudne was occupied by German troops during World War II from 1941 to 1944.

Until 18 July 2020, Rudne belonged to Lviv Municipality. The municipality was abolished in July 2020 as part of the administrative reform of Ukraine, which reduced the number of raions of Lviv Oblast to seven. The area of Lviv Municipality was merged into the newly established Lviv Raion.

References 

Urban-type settlements in Lviv Raion